N1, N.I, N-1, or N01 may refer to:

Information technology 
 Nokia N1, an Android tablet
 Nexus One, an Android phone made by HTC
 Nylas N1, a desktop email client
 Oppo N1, an Android phone
 N1, a Sun Microsystems software brand now mostly integrated into Sun Ops Center
 N1 Grid Engine, older name for Sun Grid Engine

Popular culture 
 Naboo N-1 Starfighter, a spacecraft from the Star Wars fictional universe
 Internet slang for "nice one"
 Network One, a defunct American broadcast television network
 Nippon Ichi, also known as N1, a Japanese developer and publisher of game software

Science 
 N1 (also called N100), an evoked potential over the human brain 
 N1 ring, a term used in mathematics
 A non-small cell lung carcinoma staging code for Metastasis to ipsilateral peribronchial or ipsilateral hilar lymph nodes
 Visual N1, a human brain evoked potential response
 N01, Nephritic syndrome ICD-10 code
 ATC code N01 Anesthetics, a subgroup of the Anatomical Therapeutic Chemical Classification System

Vehicles 
 USS N-1 (SS-53), a 1915 coastal defense submarine of the United States Navy
 A type of light commercial vehicle
 N1, gauges in that monitor the low-pressure compressor section of a jet engine

Airplanes 
 AEG N.I, a German World War I night bomber
 Caproni Campini N.1, a 1940 early motorjet-powered test airplane
 Naval Aircraft Factory N-1, a 1918 United States Navy maritime patrol aircraft
Northrop N-1, proposed flying wing medium bomber
Northrop N-1M, research aircraft built as a flying mockup of the Northrop N-1

Locomotives
 GNR Class N1, a British 0-6-2T steam locomotive class classified N1 under both GNR and LNER ownership
 PRR N1s, a type of steam locomotive
 SECR N1 class, a British 2-6-0 steam locomotive class
 VR Class Pr1 (original classification N1), a Finnish steam locomotive

Rockets 
 N1 (rocket), a Soviet rocket
 N-I rocket, a Japanese rocket

Other uses
 N1 (company), an Icelandic gasoline/convenience store chain
 N1 (TV channel), a cable TV news channel
 N1 (Long Island bus)
 N1, a district in the N postcode area in North London, England
 N.1 (David Carreira album), a 2011 album by David Carreira
 Nebraska Highway 1, a state highway in the U.S. state of Nebraska

See also 

 List of N1 roads
 Number One (disambiguation)
 NI (disambiguation)
 NL (disambiguation)